Pitcock may refer to:

Lands of Pitcocks, Middle Ages term for an area near East Lothian; see Robert de Lawedre of Edrington

People with the surname
 Bill Pitcock IV, guitarist with the Dwight Twilley Band
 Chuck Pitcock (1958–2016), American football player
 Joan Pitcock (born 1967), American professional golfer
 Josh Pitcock, American political operative
 Quinn Pitcock (born 1983), American football player

See also
 Petcock, a small shut-off valve
 Pidcock (disambiguation)
 Pittock (disambiguation)